Seterra is a website and app with quizzes on geography and science. It is a part of GeoGuessr. About 1 million games are played every day. 4 million new users each month play the game.

Gameplay 
In Seterra, the player can choose a map quiz, and attempt to finish the quiz in minimal time or with as high of a percentage as possible. For quizzes on locations, it shows a name of the place that the player has to attempt to click on the map. The player has three tries to attempt to click on the place. If the place is clicked in first try, the place turns white, if the place is clicked in second try, the place turns yellow, if the place is clicked in third try, the place turns dark yellow, and if the place is not clicked after three tries, it turns red.

Seterra's main feature are their quizzes on geography and science. They also have videos, a FAQ, and a blog about geography info or changes, and info about their game.

Seterra Supporter 
Although Seterra is a free website, users can support the app by using Patreon. There are three levels of Seterra memberships that cost different amounts of money and grant additional features to Seterra. Users can either pay monthly or yearly with a 16% discount.

Level 1 memberships cost $1 a month. A Level 1 membership allows the player to have custom quizzes last permanently, no ads while using Seterra, add custom places to custom quizzes, add public leaderboards to quizzes, track their high scores, and post quizzes to Google Classroom.

Level 2 memberships cost $5 a month. A Level 2 membership allows them to do everything a Level 1 member can do, and also allows them to be able to print a map to a PDF (up to 100 maps a month), and all custom quizzes created will be ad-free for all players (up to 1,000 pages a month).

Level 3 memberships cost $10 a month, and allow the player to do the same things a Level 2 member can do.

Development 
The offline version of the game was released in 1997 for Windows by Marianne Wartoft in Sweden, and became the standard geography software for schools in that country. Seterra's online version was released in 2011 with 30 different languages available in the game. On May 12, 2016, Wartoft announced the launch of Seterra as an app, available for iPad and iPhone. It is available on Mac, Windows, iOS, and iPhone, has 45 languages, and has about 400 quizzes.

Reception

References

External links 
 Official Seterra website

Educational software for Windows
Educational software companies
Geography education software
Android (operating system) games
IOS games